How the Mind Works is a 1997 book by the Canadian-American cognitive scientist Steven Pinker, in which the author attempts to explain some of the human mind's poorly understood functions and quirks in evolutionary terms. Drawing heavily on the paradigm of evolutionary psychology articulated by John Tooby and Leda Cosmides, Pinker covers subjects such as vision, emotion, feminism, and "the meaning of life". He argues for both a computational theory of mind and a neo-Darwinist, adaptationist approach to evolution, all of which he sees as the central components of evolutionary psychology. He criticizes difference feminism because he believes scientific research has shown that women and men differ little or not at all in their moral reasoning. The book was a Pulitzer Prize Finalist.

Reception

Jerry Fodor, considered one of the fathers of the computational theory of mind, criticized the book. Fodor wrote a book called The Mind Doesn't Work That Way, saying "There is, in short, every reason to suppose that the Computational Theory is part of the truth about cognition. But it hadn't occurred to me that anyone could suppose that it's a very large part of the truth; still less that it's within miles of being the whole story about how the mind works". He continued, "I was, and remain, perplexed by an attitude of ebullient optimism that's particularly characteristic of Pinker's book. As just remarked, I would have thought that the last forty or fifty years have demonstrated pretty clearly that there are aspects of higher mental processes into which the current armamentarium of computational models, theories and experimental techniques offers vanishingly little insight."

Pinker responded to Fodor's criticisms in Mind & Language. Pinker argued that Fodor had attacked straw man positions, wryly suggesting a possible title for his riposte as No One Ever Said it Did.

Daniel Levitin has criticized Pinker for referring to music as an "auditory cheesecake" in the book. In his book This Is Your Brain on Music (2006), Levitin takes some time in the last chapter to rebut Pinker’s arguments. When asked about Levitin's book by New York Times journalist Clive Thompson, Pinker said he hadn't read it.

References

External links
 Pinker's website on How the Mind Works
 Video of a 1999 lecture based on the book 
 
 "The Trouble with Psychological Darwinism" by Jerry Fodor, a critical review of How the Mind Works
 "The mind doesn't work that way", abstract of a book by Jerry Fodor in response to How the Mind Works

1997 non-fiction books
Cognitive science literature
Books about cognition
Books about evolutionary psychology
English-language books
Works by Steven Pinker
W. W. Norton & Company books